The 1961 Men's South American Volleyball Championship, the 4th tournament, took place in 1961 in Lima.

Final positions

External links
Men Volleyball South American Championship
El Vóleibol en Chile 

Mens South American Volleyball Championship, 1961
Men's South American Volleyball Championships
1961 in South American sport
1961 in Peruvian sport
International volleyball competitions hosted by Peru